The New Europe, subtitled "A Weekly Review of Foreign Politics," was a weekly political magazine published in the United Kingdom between 1916 and 1920.

Funded by David Davies, it spread ideas related to federalism, such as the emancipation of various Slavic nations from the Central Powers. It was founded by the political activist and historian Robert William Seton-Watson, Henry Wickham Steed, Ronald Montagu Burrows and Frederic William Whyte, with the help of Tomáš Garrigue Masaryk. Others involved with the magazine included Erskine Childers, Anatole France, the brothers Reginald "Rex" Leeper and Allen Leeper, Oscar Browning, James Frazer, Bernard Pares, Samuel Hoare, Leonard Woolf and Salvador de Madariaga.

References

Bibliography

 
 
 
 
 
 
 
The New Europe archive at HathiTrust

1916 establishments in the United Kingdom
1920 disestablishments in the United Kingdom
Weekly magazines published in the United Kingdom
Defunct political magazines published in the United Kingdom
Magazines disestablished in 1920
Magazines established in 1916